SS Elihu Root was a Liberty ship built in the United States during World War II. She was named after Elihu Root, a United States senator from New York, the United States Secretary of War under presidents William McKinley and Theodore Roosevelt, the United States Secretary of State under Theodore Roosevelt, and the 1912 Nobel Peace Prize laureate.

Construction
Elihu Root was laid down on 5 October 1942, under a Maritime Commission (MARCOM) contract, MC hull 1524, by J.A. Jones Construction, Panama City, Florida; sponsored by Mrs. Lloyd Tower, sister of the assistant superintendent of the boiler shop, W. H. Moyd, she was launched on 19 May 1943.

History
She was allocated to Agwilines Inc., on 18 June 1943. On 5 June 1946, she was laid up in the National Defense Reserve Fleet, in the Hudson River Group. On 29 May 1953, she was withdrawn from the fleet to be loaded with grain under the "Grain Program 1953", she returned loaded with grain on 9 June 1953. She was withdrawn from the fleet on 20 June 1957, to have the grain unloaded, she returned empty on 29 June 1957. On 28 May 1958, she was withdrawn from the fleet to be loaded with grain under the "Grain Program 1958", she returned loaded with grain on 13 June 1958. She was withdrawn from the fleet on 8 February 1960, to have the grain unloaded, she returned empty on 12 February 1960. On 9 November 1960, she was withdrawn from the fleet to be loaded with grain under the "Grain Program 1960", she returned loaded with grain on 22 November 1960. She was withdrawn from the fleet on 14 March 1963, to have the grain unloaded, she returned empty on 18 March 1963. On 10 October 1969, she was sold for $42,218 to Union Minerals and Alloys Corporation, for scrapping. She was removed from the fleet on 30 October 1969.

References

Bibliography

 
 
 
 

 

Liberty ships
Ships built in Panama City, Florida
1943 ships
Hudson River Reserve Fleet
Hudson River Reserve Fleet Grain Program